Jeff A. Melvin is a Canadian set decorator. Best known for his work on the 2017 film, The Shape of Water, for which he won Academy Award for Best Production Design, with production designer Paul Denham Austerberry, and set decorator, Shane Vieau. The trio also won the BAFTA award for Production Design on February 18.

References

External links 
 

Living people
Best Art Direction Academy Award winners
Best Production Design BAFTA Award winners
Canadian production designers
Year of birth missing (living people)